Football Association of Odisha (FAO) is the state governing body of football in  Odisha, India. The Odisha football team and Odisha women's football team is administrated by the Football Association of Odisha. It is affiliated with the All India Football Federation, the national administrating body for football in India. It was formed in 1949 and was made into an independent registered body in 1961. The organisation was renamed after the Orissa Football Association was dissolved in 2010.

Teams

State Teams

State Youth Teams

Competitions & structure

Men
FAO League
FAO Super Cup
Kalinga Cup
FAO Inter District Club Championship
Sahani Cup (Senior Inter-District Football Championship)

Women
 Odisha Women's League

Others
FAO Inter Club Futsal Championship

Honours

Men
B. C. Roy Trophy (Junior National Football Championship)
 Winners (1): 1968–69
 Runners-up (2): 1961–62, 1976–77

Mir Iqbal Hussain Trophy (Sub-Junior National Football Championship)
 Winners (1): 2018–19
 Runners-up (4): 1993–94, 2000–01, 2012–13, 2015–16

Women
Senior Women's National Football Championship
 Winners (1): 2010–11
 Runners-up (6): 2000–01, 2001–02, 2007–08, 2009–10, 2013–14, 2018–19

National Games
 Gold medal (2): 2007, 2011
 Silver medal (2): 2015, 2022
 Bronze medal (1): 2002

Junior Girl's National Football Championship
 Runners-up (8): 2002–03, 2005–06, 2007–08, 2008–09, 2011–12, 2013–14, 2015–16, 2017–18

Sub–Junior Girl's National Football Championship
 Winners (1): 2006–07
 Runners-up (7): 2003–04, 2004–05, 2007–08, 2008–09, 2009–10, 2010–11, 2018–19

Federation awards
2015 AIFF Award for Best Grassroots Programme

2017–18 AIFF's FIFA Development Project Rank #10

Management

AIFF Committee Members

Accredited academies

References

Football governing bodies in India
Organisations based in Odisha
Football in Odisha
1949 establishments in Orissa
Sports organizations established in 1949